Caterina Valentino (Caracas, February 6, 1976) is a Venezuelan radio and television host, actress and model. She currently hosts the program Contigo... on La Romántica 88.9 FM in Caracas, a radio station part of the FM Center network.

Biography 
Valentino grew up in the Caracas neighborhood of Catia, the daughter of Italian immigrants. She studied Computer Engineering at the Metropolitan University, which she abandoned to dedicate herself to Journalism. She graduated from the Andrés Bello Catholic University in 2000.

She began her professional career at Puma TV, a Venezuelan UHF channel dedicated to promoting music videos, owned by singer José Luis Rodríguez. In 1997, she went on to Radio Caracas Televisión, where she presented, along with Kike Vallés, a youth version of the nature-adventure program Expedición, called Planeta Sur.

At the same time, Valentino joined FM Center network to host Contigo..., a program that was originally broadcast at weekends. The show currently airs Monday through Friday between 5:00 and 7:00 p.m.

Valentino joined Venevisión in 2007 to host the reality show Sudando La Gota Gorda, a local adaptation of The Biggest Loser format. After three seasons on the air, in 2010, she went on to present another reality competition program, Who is the better dancer?, with Hony Estrella and which was broadcast simultaneously on Venevisión in Venezuela and on Telesistema 11 in the Dominican Republic.

In 2010, she also joined E! Entertainment Television, as host of the E! VIP Caracas, a space that showed the nightlife in the Venezuelan capital, as well as interviews with local celebrities. She has hosted red carpet events and Fashion Week events in Aruba and Madrid, among others.

Valentino switched to Televen in 2012 to host ¿Hay Corazón?, a local adaptation of 12 Corazones, produced by Telemundo. On July 30, 2012 Televen removed the program from its regular schedule at 7:00 p.m., after a notification from Conatel, the Venezuelan telecommunications regulatory body, about its content. The program returned in October of the same year with a version suitable for all audiences, but on April 23, 2013, Conatel, following an order from the then Minister of Communication and Information, Ernesto Villegas, initiated an administrative sanction procedure against the channel, and permanently closing the program.

In 2013, Valentino published her autobiography titled Valiente Corazón (Brave Heart). In the book, Valentino reveals that she was victim of sexual abuse during her childhood by one of her music teachers. She has also been a columnist for the newspaper El Nacional and the Venezuelan website Caraota Digital.

In 2014, her program on E! It was renamed Zona Trendy Caracas. On March 31, 2016, through her Instagram account, Valentino announced the departure of the program from the air due to safety concerns in Venezuela. "My team from Zona Trendy Caracas -a program broadcast by E! -, were attacked by crime on several occasions. In the last recordings we had to go out with bodyguards, for the safety of everyone and the technical staff. Everything became complicated."

Valentino made her soap opera debut in Amor Secreto, by Venevisión, in 2015. She played Rebeca Villegas de Ferrándiz, one of the villains in history. She landed the role after Christina Dieckmann retired from production alleging personal issues.

Since 2012, Valentino has been a correspondent for Caracol Internacional for Venezuela. In addition, in 2018 she joined Antena 3 as a correspondent in Caracas. For her journalistic work, she was awarded the Order of Dignity and Homeland by the Colombian Congress in 2017. In 2019, she was awarded by the Government of Italy with the Ordine Stella D'Italia Cavaliere, in recognition of her work as a journalist, and for strengthening the cultural ties between Italy and Venezuela.

References 

1976 births
Actresses from Caracas
Venezuelan female models
Venezuelan actresses
Venezuelan people of Italian descent
Venezuelan journalists
Living people